Indriyanto Nugroho (born 14 September 1976) is a retired  Indonesian footballer who plays as striker for Persepam Pamekasan and the Indonesia national team in the 1996 AFC Asian Cup. Besides Indonesia, he has played in Italy.

References

External links

1976 births
Association football forwards
Living people
Indonesian footballers
Indonesia international footballers
Pelita Jaya FC players
Persekaba Blora players
Persepam Madura Utama players
Persiba Bantul players
Persih Tembilahan players
Persija Jakarta players
Persik Kediri players
PSIS Semarang players
Indonesian Premier Division players
Place of birth missing (living people)
People from Sukoharjo Regency
Sportspeople from Central Java